Dame Sandra Prunella Mason  (born 17 January 1949) is a Barbadian politician, lawyer, and diplomat who is serving as the first president of Barbados since 2021. She was previously the eighth and final governor-general of Barbados from 2018 to 2021, the second woman to hold the office. On 20 October 2021, Mason was elected by the Parliament of Barbados to become the country's first president, and took office on 30 November 2021, when Barbados ceased to be a constitutional monarchy and became a republic.

Mason was a practicing attorney-at-law who has served as a High Court judge in Saint Lucia and a Court of Appeal judge in Barbados, and was the first woman admitted to the bar in Barbados. She served as chair of the CARICOM commission to evaluate regional integration, was the first magistrate appointed an ambassador from Barbados, and was the first woman to serve on the country's Supreme Court. She was the first appointee from Barbados to the Commonwealth Secretariat Arbitral Tribunal. In 2017, she was appointed the 8th governor-general of Barbados, with a term beginning on 8 January 2018. Simultaneously with her appointment, Mason was awarded the Dame Grand Cross in the Order of Saint Michael and Saint George. On assumption of the office of Governor-General, she became the Chancellor of the Order of National Heroes, Order of Barbados and the Order of Freedom.

Early life and education 
Sandra Prunella Mason was born on 17 January 1949 in Saint Philip, Barbados. After studying at St. Catherine's Primary School until age nine, she attended secondary school at Queen's College, then began teaching at the Princess Margaret Secondary School in 1968. The following year, she worked at Barclays Bank as a clerk. Mason enrolled in the University of the West Indies at Cave Hill, where she earned a Bachelor of Laws. Mason was one of the first graduates of the Faculty of Law from UWI, Cave Hill, completing her education in 1973.

In 1975 she obtained a Legal Education Certificate from Hugh Wooding Law School in Trinidad and Tobago, becoming the first woman attorney-at-law from Barbados to graduate from the school. She was admitted to the bar on 10 November the same year, becoming the first woman member of the Barbados Bar Association. She is a Soroptimist and Patron of SI Barbados.

Early career and legal practice 
Beginning in 1975, she worked in Trust Administration for Barclay's and transferred to several different posts within the Barclay's company until 1977.

In 1978, Mason began working as the Magistrate of the Juvenile and Family Court and simultaneously tutoring in family law at UWI. She stopped tutoring in 1983 and continuing as magistrate. In 1988, Mason completed the Royal Institute of Public Administration in London's course on Judicial Administration. She served on the UN Committee on the Rights of the Child from its 1991 inception until 1999, holding the vice chair from 1993 to 1995 and chair from 1997 to 1999.

Between 1991 and 1992, Mason served as chair and was one of the two women appointed to the 13-member CARICOM commission charged with evaluating regional integration. She left the family court in 1992 to serve as an ambassador to Venezuela, and was the first woman magistrate from Barbados to serve in that position. Between 1993 and 1994 she also served as ambassador to Chile, Colombia and Brazil. Upon her return to Barbados in 1994, Mason was appointed Chief Magistrate for Barbados, and in 1997 became the Registrar of the Supreme Court.

In 2000, Mason completed studies on Alternative Dispute Resolution at the University of Windsor in Windsor, Ontario, Canada, and then completed a Fellowship with the Commonwealth Judicial Education Institute in Halifax, Nova Scotia, in 2001, as well as a course in Advanced Dispute Resolution at UWI.   She continued to serve as Registrar of the Supreme Court until 2005, when she was appointed as Queen's Counsel to the Inner Bar of Barbados. In 2008, Mason was sworn in as an Appeals Judge becoming the first woman to serve on the Barbados Court of Appeals. For three days in 2012, she became the acting Governor-General of Barbados and the following year was the first Barbadian appointed to membership in the Commonwealth Secretariat Arbitral Tribunal (CSAT). The Tribunal operates among members of the Commonwealth of Nations to resolve issues concerning contract disputes. With that appointment, Loop News named her one of the 10 most powerful women in Barbados.

Governor-General of Barbados 

In 2017, Mason was appointed as the eighth Governor-General of Barbados, with a term beginning on 8 January 2018. Simultaneously with her appointment, Mason was also appointed a Dame Grand Cross in the Order of Saint Michael and Saint George.

In 2020, Mason, in her official capacity announcing government policy in the Throne Speech, written by the government of Prime Minister Mia Mottley, stated that Barbados would become a republic, abolishing the Barbadian monarchy. She was then expected to be nominated as a candidate to be the first president of Barbados, then to be elected by the two houses of parliament, and to assume office on 30 November 2021.

President of Barbados 
On 12 October 2021, Mason was nominated by Prime Minister Mia Mottley and Opposition Leader Joseph Atherley to become the first President of Barbados. On 20 October she was elected by both houses without opposition, although no national vote amongst the people was ever held. Mason took office on 30 November 2021, the 55th anniversary of Independence. While she is nominally chief executive and is the sole head of state in Barbados, in practice her role is mostly ceremonial, much like her previous role as Governor-General. She made her first official visit to Kenya in June 2022.

Honours 
 Chancellor and Principal Dame of St. Andrew Order of Barbados (DA)
 Dame Grand Cross of the Order of St. Michael and St. George (GCMG)
 Dame of Grace of The Most Venerable Order of the Hospital of St. John (DStJ)
 Order of Freedom of Barbados (FB)

References

Citations

Bibliography

External links 
 Dame Sandra Prunella Mason, GCMG, D.A., Q.C., Governor-General of Barbados at the Government of Barbados's official site

 

Living people
1949 births
20th-century Barbadian lawyers
20th-century women lawyers
21st-century Barbadian lawyers
21st-century women lawyers
21st-century Barbadian women politicians
21st-century Barbadian politicians
Ambassadors of Barbados to Brazil
Ambassadors of Barbados to Venezuela
Barbadian judges
Barbadian lawyers
Barbadian Queen's Counsel
Barbadian women ambassadors
Barbadian women lawyers
Dames Grand Cross of the Order of St Michael and St George
Female heads of state
Women presidents
Governors-General of Barbados
Presidents of Barbados
Heads of state of Barbados
Recipients of the Order of Freedom of Barbados
Knights and Dames of St Andrew (Barbados)
People from Saint Philip, Barbados
University of the West Indies alumni
University of Windsor Faculty of Law alumni
Queen's College (Barbados) alumni
Female governors-general